The 2003 World Series Lights season was contested over eight race weekends with 16 races. In this one-make formula all drivers had to use the new Dallara chassis (Light 01/WSL3) and Nissan engines (Nissan AER). Six different teams and sixteen drivers competed with the titles going to Argentinian driver Juan Cruz Álvarez and Spanish team Meycom.

Teams and drivers
All teams used the Dallara WSL3 chassis and Nissan AER engines.

Race calendar and results

Final points standings
For every race the points were awarded: 15 points to the winner, 12 for runner-up, 10 for third place, 8 for fourth place, 6 for fifth place, winding down to 1 point for 10th place. Lower placed drivers did not award points. Additional points were awarded to the driver setting the fastest race lap (2 points). 

 Points System:

{|
|

References

External links

Renault Sport Series seasons
World Series by Nissan
World Series by Nissan
World Series Lights